Vértiz is a village and rural locality (municipality) in La Pampa Province in Argentina. It has a population of 501 people (as of 2015).

References

Populated places in La Pampa Province